Growth Plan may refer to:

 Growth and Transformation Plan, a national five-year plan introduced by the Ethiopian government in 2011 
 Growth Plan for the Greater Golden Horseshoe, 2006 regional growth management policy for the Greater Golden Horseshoe area of southern Ontario, Canada
 September 2022 United Kingdom mini-budget, known officially as "The Growth Plan"

See also
 Growth planning